Ronald N. Drummond (born 1959 in Seattle, Washington) is a writer, editor, and independent scholar.

Writer
Ron Drummond is the author of "The Sonic Rituals of Pauline Oliveros"; "The Frequency of Liberation", a critical fiction about the novels of Steve Erickson; "Ducré in Euphonia: Ideal and Influence in Berlioz"; "Broken Seashells,", an essay/meditation on ancestral memory and the music of Jethro Tull; and the introductory essays for the 8-volume edition in score and parts of The Vienna String Quartets of Anton Reicha; and other essays, fictions, poems, reviews, and interviews. More recent publications include a short story, "Troll," published in Black Clock, and a performance essay on the Tokyo String Quartet.

Editor
As an editor, Drummond worked with the novelist and critic Samuel R. Delany on the essay collections The Straits of Messina (1989), Longer Views (1996), the novel They Fly at Çiron (1993), collection Atlantis: Three Tales (1995), a novel-in-progress, Shoat Rumblin (2002), and Dark Reflections (2007); he was the publisher of Çiron and Atlantis. Drummond is also a proofreader and editorial redactor of Delany's most famous novel, Dhalgren (Bantam Books, 1974; Wesleyan University Press, 1996; Vintage Books, 2001). Delany wrote, "Ron's editorial acumen is the highest I have encountered in a professional writing career of more than thirty years." In March 2006, Drummond gave a talk on "Editing Samuel R. Delany" at an international academic conference on Delany's life and work held at SUNY Buffalo.

Drummond also worked with novelist John Crowley, publishing Crowley's short story collection Antiquities (1993), editing the novels Dæmonomania (2000) and Endless Things (2007), and the electronic versions of Ægypt and Love & Sleep (ElectricStory.com, 2002). He sold subscriptions for a deluxe 25th anniversary edition  of Crowley's 1981 novel Little, Big , slated for publication in 2007, and finally published in October 2022.

Designer
From September 2002 through June 2003, Drummond created an original design for the World Trade Center Memorial called 'A Garden Stepping into the Sky'. The design was the focus of a documentary by independent filmmaker Gregg Lachow and was featured on CNN.com and Seattle's KOMO-TV News.

See also

 Albacon

References

External links

 Dreaming of Dao Gaia
 Lunar Sacrament
 Broken Seashells
 The Sonic Rituals of Pauline Oliveros
 The Frequency of Liberation
 No Royal Directive: Joseph Haydn and the String Quartet
 Jupiter in the Age of Enlightenment
 Aperçu of Apotheosis Beethoven dancing
 Czech Classicism: The Sweat of the Brow
 The String Quartets of Anton Reicha
 Anton Reicha: A Biographical Sketch
 On First Hearing the Stochastic Kaleidophon of Carter Scholz
 The Dumpster Concerto
 Merton Music String Chamber Music Catalog 2006/2007
 The 25th Anniversary Edition of John Crowley's Little, Big

American musicologists
American print editors
American science fiction writers
American short story writers
1959 births
Living people
Writers from Seattle
Writers from Troy, New York
Independent scholars
American male short story writers
American male novelists
Novelists from New York (state)
Novelists from Washington (state)